The 1899 Harvard Crimson football team was an American football team that represented Harvard University as an independent during the 1899 college football season. In its first season under head coach Benjamin Dibblee, the Crimson compiled a 10–0–1 record, shut out 10 of 11 opponents, and outscored all opponents by a total of 210 to 10.

There was no contemporaneous system in 1899 for determining a national champion. However, Harvard was retroactively named as the national champion by the Helms Athletic Foundation, Houlgate System, and National Championship Foundation. Princeton compiled a 12–1 record and was named the national champion by two other selectors.

Two Harvard players were consensus first-team selections on the 1899 All-American football team: quarterback Charles Dudley Daly and end Dave Campbell. Other players included halfback George A. Sawin, end John Hallowell, center Francis Lowell Burnett, guard William A. M. Burden Sr., and tackle Malcolm Donald.

Schedule

References

Harvard
Harvard Crimson football seasons
College football national champions
College football undefeated seasons
Harvard Crimson football